For M is a current affairs and talk television show in the Philippines. It hosted by Marigold Haber-Dunca and Mr. Fu, and aired every Monday evenings on Radio Philippines Network.

Hosts
 Marigold Haber-Dunca 
 Mr. Fu

See also
List of Philippine television shows
List of programs previously broadcast by Radio Philippines Network

Philippine television talk shows
RPN News and Public Affairs shows
2006 Philippine television series debuts
2007 Philippine television series endings
Radio Philippines Network original programming